Hautot-Saint-Sulpice is a commune in the Seine-Maritime département in the Normandy region in northern France.

Geography

Population

Places of interest
 Church of St. Sulpice, dating from the 11th century
 Some 16th-century houses
 The Chaplaincy of St Mary the Virgin, part of the Anglican Catholic Church European Deanery, Currently under the Diocese of the United Kingdom, is in the Village.

See also
Communes of the Seine-Maritime department

References

External links

 ACC Chaplaincy

Communes of Seine-Maritime